Michael Walchhofer (born 28 April 1975) is a former World Cup alpine ski racer from Austria.

Biography
Walchhofer was born in Radstadt, Salzburg, Austria, and started his career in slalom, but then moved over to the speed events. During his career he won the World Cup season title in downhill three times, an Olympic silver medal, and one gold, two silvers, and a bronze medal at World Championships. Walchofer became the first to win the Bormio downhill three times in December 2010. His last World Cup race was the downhill at the finals in Lenzerheide in March 2011.

Walchhofer has been a longtime owner a chain of slopeside luxury hotels and also runs a ski school.

World Cup results

Season titles

Season standings

Race victories
19 wins – (14 DH, 3 SG, 2 SC/K)
49 podiums – (36 DH, 9 SG, 4 SC/K)

World Championship results

Olympic results

European Cup

Season titles

Race victories
5 wins – (2 DH, 3 SL)
8 podiums – (4 DH, 4 SL)

References

External links
 
 
 
 Walchhofer Hotels

1975 births
Living people
People from Radstadt
Alpine skiers at the 2002 Winter Olympics
Alpine skiers at the 2006 Winter Olympics
Alpine skiers at the 2010 Winter Olympics
Austrian male alpine skiers
Olympic alpine skiers of Austria
Olympic silver medalists for Austria
Olympic medalists in alpine skiing
FIS Alpine Ski World Cup champions
Medalists at the 2006 Winter Olympics
Sportspeople from Salzburg (state)